Slovenia competed at the 2005 World Championships in Athletics held in Helsinki, Finland, from 6-14 August 2005. The country was represented by eight athletes, four men and four women.

Results

Key
Q = Qualified for the next round
q = Qualified for the next round as a fastest loser or, in field events, by position without achieving the qualifying target
NR = National record
PB = Personal best
SB = Season's best
N/A = Round not applicable for the event

Men
Track and road events

Field events

Women
Track and road events

Field events

References

Nations at the 2005 World Championships in Athletics
World Championships in Athletics
Slovenia at the World Championships in Athletics